The men's 4 × 100 metres event at the 2015 Asian Athletics Championships was held on June 4.

Medalists

*Athletes who competed in heats only.

Results

Heats
First 3 in each heat (Q) and 2 best performers (q) advanced to the final.

Final

References

Relay
Relays at the Asian Athletics Championships